William Sam Douglas Harry Boyle (born 1 September 1995) is a professional footballer who plays as a centre back for  club Huddersfield Town.

Club career

Huddersfield Town
Boyle was born in Garforth, West Yorkshire. He attended Garforth Community College before joining Huddersfield Town's academy at under-15 level from his local club Garforth Villa in October 2010. He was nearly ever-present for the under-18 team in the 2012–13 season. He made his first-team debut for Huddersfield as a late substitute in the 3–0 win against Reading on 24 February 2015.

On 26 March 2015, he joined Conference Premier club Kidderminster Harriers on loan for the rest of the season, and made two appearances for the club. On 5 August 2015, he joined Macclesfield Town on loan for two months.

On 18 November 2015, Boyle joined League Two club York City on a youth loan until 3 January 2016. He made his debut on 21 November 2015 when starting York's 3–2 away to Leyton Orient, in which he struggled to cope with the physicality of opponent striker Ollie Palmer. He struck up a partnership at centre-back with Dave Winfield, and despite York wanting to extend his loan Boyle returned to Huddersfield in January 2016. Having made only one appearance as a late substitute after returning to Huddersfield, he rejoined York on loan until the end of the 2015–16 season on 26 February 2016.

In June 2016, Boyle and fellow Huddersfield player Flo Bojaj joined Scottish Premiership club Kilmarnock on a six-month loan deal. He scored on his debut, as Kilmarnock beat Clyde 2–1 in the Scottish League Cup on 16 July 2016. The goal came after he had earlier conceded a penalty, which was saved by Kilmarnock goalkeeper Jamie MacDonald. Boyle returned to Huddersfield in January 2017, having made 14 appearances and scored 1 goal for Kilmarnock.

Cheltenham Town
On 9 January 2017, Boyle signed for League Two club Cheltenham Town on a one-and-a-half-year contract. He made his League Two debut for the club in a 3–0 home victory over Accrington Stanley on 14 January 2017. In April 2018, he signed a new contract keeping him at the club until the summer of 2020.

In May 2020, he signed a new two-year contract extension at Cheltenham. Following an impressive 2020–21 season, Boyle was named in the 2020–21 EFL League Two Team of the Season at the league's annual awards ceremony.

Huddersfield Town return
On 6 June 2022, Boyle signed a two-year contract with his first club Huddersfield Town, returning on a free transfer active from the expiration of his Cheltenham Town contract.

International career
Boyle's father is Scottish, and he attended an under-18s training camp for the Scotland national football team in October 2012.

Career statistics

Honours

Cheltenham Town
League Two: 2020–21

Individual
EFL League Two Team of the Season: 2020–21
PFA Team of the Year: 2020–21 League Two

References

External links
Profile at the Cheltenham Town F.C. website

1995 births
Living people
People from Garforth
Footballers from Leeds
English footballers
Association football defenders
Huddersfield Town A.F.C. players
Kidderminster Harriers F.C. players
Macclesfield Town F.C. players
York City F.C. players
Kilmarnock F.C. players
English Football League players
National League (English football) players
Scottish Professional Football League players
English people of Scottish descent
People educated at Garforth Academy